Killer Instinct World Cup is an annual fighting game tournament held in Texas, specifically focusing on the 2013 Killer Instinct reboot. The event's first incarnation was in January 2016 which featured Killer Instinct with a total of 32 qualifiers. The finals uses a double-elimination format and includes various tournaments as qualifiers such as EVO and Combo Breaker.

History

2016 season
The 2016 Killer Instinct World Cup Finals was announced by Ultra Arcade's Brandon Alexander in December 2014, which initially had a $10,000 prize pool with 16 qualifiers, but was eventually increased to a $30,000 prize pool with 32 qualifiers. Four last chance qualifying spots were held as well. The tournament was won by EVO 2015 Champion Jonathan "Rico Suave" Deleon, who primarily used Shadow Jago in the tournament, however used Omen against Matt Rebelo in Winner's Finals due to the lack of TJ Combo matchup experience and Glacius in Grand Finals as a hard counter to Lenin "MyGod" Castillo's Sabrewulf. The EVO 2014 Champion, Emmanuel "CD Jr." Brito has notably tied for last, despite being seeded 3rd in the bracket.
The #1 player in points rankings Kenneth "Bass" Armas was notably upset in the first round of the tournament to one of the Last Chance qualifiers Joshua "Waterhorses" Vargas, while managing to blast through Loser's Bracket, while bowing out to FlipSid3 Tactics' Darnell "Sleep" Waller. However, one of the most unexpected placings was Canadian player Rebelo ending in 3rd place while being sent to Loser's by Rico Suave in Winner's Finals, followed by being eliminated by MyGod in a Loser's Finals runback from an early Winner's Bracket upset.

Killer Instinct World Cup took place at the Fountain Bleu in San Antonio, Texas on January 30–31, 2016.

2017 season
The 2017 Killer Instinct World Cup was announced on April 5, 2016. The season would include more offline qualifiers than the previous season, as well as once again being a 32-man finals. In 2017, the KI World Cup issued a ban towards taunting and teabagging, following its frequent practice by NuckleDu in Street Fighter V. This would spark controversy from the fighting game community with members such as Echo Fox pro SonicFox and Iron Galaxy Studios dev Adam "Keits" Heart speaking about their disdain regarding the ban. Lab monster Javits used Daigo Umehara's playstyle from EVO Moment #37 as a reference to mention that enforcing such rule would be impossible. The teabagging ban would later be revoked following the controversy surrounding the rule, while there is still zero tolerance policies for threats and sexual harassment.

The event took place from March 10 to 12 of 2017. The Kilgore DLC raised more than $50,000 towards the 2018 season's prize pool.

References

External links
Killer Instinct website
Ultra Arcade Twitter Page
Ultra Arcade Facebook Page
Killer Instinct World Cup standings

Killer Instinct
Events in Texas
2014 establishments in Texas
Fighting game tournaments